Junior Salomon (born 8 April 1986) is a Beninese professional footballer who plays as a defender for Plateau United and the Benin national team.

Club career
Born in Abomey, Benin, Salomon began his career with Université Nationale du Bénin FC, before joining ASPAC Cotonou in November 2009. He left Benin in December 2011 and joined top Ivorian club ASEC Mimosas.

He then returned to Benin in 2013 to play for USS Kraké, briefly before being transferred to former Nigerian champions Bayelsa United in March of the same year. He joined promoted Plateau United ahead of the 2016 season after Bayelsa was relegated.

International career
Salomon was part of the Benin national football team at the 2010 African Cup of Nations in Angola.

Career statistics

International

References

Living people
1986 births
People from Abomey
Association football defenders
Beninese footballers
Benin international footballers
2010 Africa Cup of Nations players
2019 Africa Cup of Nations players
Université Nationale du Bénin FC players
ASEC Mimosas players
Bayelsa United F.C. players
USS Kraké players
Plateau United F.C. players